Thon Hotels (formerly known as Rainbow Hotels) is a Norwegian-based hotel chain.  It is  currently the 3rd largest hotel chain in Norway with 50-odd hotels in Norway, Belgium and the Netherlands.

History
The Thon Hotel chain was  established in 1989. Thon Hotels is part of the Olav Thon Group (Olav Thon Gruppen) which in turn is owned by the Olav Thon Foundation (Olav Thon Stiftelsen). Olav Thon bought  Hotel Bristol in Oslo in 1974.  In 1983  Thon  bought his second hotel, before he founded Rainbow Hotel in 1989, which included 10 hotels.  Over the next couple of decades, the hotel chain grew in numbers, and Thon extended his hotel business to Brussels in 1995 when he bought two hotels in the Belgium capital.
Rainbow Hotels were rebranded to Thon Hotels in 2005.

Gallery

References

Other sources
The 53 places to Go in 2008
Thon Hotels with stronger environmental profile
Scandinavia: Accommodations Listings
Olav Thon, The World's Richest People - Forbes

External links

 

Hotel chains
Hotels in Norway
Companies based in Oslo
Hospitality companies of Norway
Norwegian brands